The Princeton Theological Review is an annual academic journal published by students of Princeton Theological Seminary. It was first published with the title Biblical Repertory in 1825 by the Princeton Seminary graduate and professor, Charles Hodge. The name was changed to Biblical Repertory and Theological Review in 1829, Biblical Repertory and Princeton Review in 1837, Presbyterian Quarterly and Princeton Review in 1872, The Princeton Review in 1878, The Presbyterian Review in 1880, The New Princeton Review in 1886, The Presbyterian and Reformed Review in 1890, and finally Princeton Theological Review in 1903. In 1929 the trustees of Princeton Theological Seminary discontinued its subsidization. It was revived in the mid 1990s as The Princeton Theological Review. It again went dormant in 2012 but was revitalized in the 2014–2015 academic year.

References

External links
 
 Journal archives 1825-1929

Princeton Theological Seminary
Academic journals edited by students
English-language journals
Protestant studies journals
Publications established in 1825
Publications disestablished in 1929